The 2020–21 Miami RedHawks men's ice hockey season was the 43rd season of play for the program and the 8th in the NCHC conference. The RedHawks represented Miami University and were coached by Chris Bergeron, in his 2nd season.

Season
As a result of the ongoing COVID-19 pandemic the entire college ice hockey season was delayed. Because the NCAA had previously announced that all winter sports athletes would retain whatever eligibility they possessed through at least the following year, none of Miami's players would lose a season of play. However, the NCAA also approved a change in its transfer regulations that would allow players to transfer and play immediately rather than having to sit out a season, as the rules previously required.

Miami, along with several other NCHC teams, began the season in Omaha, Nebraska and played a sizable number of games in December. In an effort to create a pseudo-bubble and protect the teams from COVID-19, the RedHawks played 10 games over a three-week period. Miami began with a goalie rotation, having Ben Kraws and Ludvid Persson alternating starts, but by the end of the month, the team had settled on Persson as their starting netminder. At the beginning of January the team sat near the bottom of the conference, winning just two of those ten games. When play returned to home campus sites, there was a brief glimmer of hope for the RedHawks as the team won back-to-back games at Western Michigan but then the bottom dropped out. Miami played just three teams the rest of the regular season and ended up losing 10 of their final 12 games. Miami finished last in the NCHC and were easily bounced from the conference tournament. The only saving grace for the program was Persson's performance which could help the team moving forward.

Departures

Recruiting

Roster
As of March 1, 2021.

Standings

Schedule and Results

|-
!colspan=12 style=";" | Regular Season

|-
!colspan=12 style=";" |

Scoring statistics

Goaltending statistics

Rankings

USCHO did not release a poll in week 20.

Awards and honors

Players drafted into the NHL

2021 NHL Entry Draft

† incoming freshman

References

Miami RedHawks men's ice hockey seasons
Miami RedHawks
Miami RedHawks
Miami RedHawks
Miami RedHawks
Miami RedHawks